AME Publishing Company is an academic publishing company, which publishes medical journals and books. Founded in July 2009, it is currently headquartered in Hong Kong, with additional offices in Guangzhou, Changsha, Nanjing, Shanghai, Chengdu, Beijing, Taipei, and Hangzhou. Its name stands for "Academic Made Easy/Excellent/Enthusiastic". It has published over 50 medical journals, as well as 20 English-language books, 28 Chinese-language books, and 60 e-books. 

It was included on Beall's list of predatory publishers. Although the publisher did not make an official response statement, one of its journals subsequently published a commissioned editorial skeptical of the list. In 2020 it signed up to the Publons review tracking service in order to improve its peer review processes.

Journals 
The company currently publishes over 60 medical journals:
 AME Case Reports
 AME Medical Journal
 AME Surgical Journal
 Annals of Blood
 Annals of Breast Surgery
 Annals of Cancer Epidemiology
 Annals of Cardiothoracic Surgery
 Annals of Esophagus
 Annals of Eye Science
 Annals of Infection
 Annals of Joint
 Annals of Laparoscopic and Endoscopic Surgery
 Annals of Lymphoma
 Annals of Nasopharynx Cancer
 Annals of Palliative Medicine
 Annals of Pancreatic Cancer
 Annals of Research Hospitals
 Annals of Thyroid
 Annals of Translational Medicine
 Art of Surgery
 Australian Journal of Otolaryngology
 Biotarget
 Bone & Joint Investigation
 Cardiovascular Diagnosis and Therapy
 Chinese Clinical Oncology
 Current Challenges in Thoracic Surgery
 Digestive Medicine Research
 ExRNA
 Frontiers of Oral and Maxillofacial Medicine
 Gastrointestinal Stromal Tumor
 Gland Surgery
 Gynecology and Pelvic Medicine
 Health Technology
 Hepatobiliary Surgery and Nutrition
 Journal of Emergency and Critical Care Medicine
 Journal of Gastrointestinal Oncology
 Journal of Hospital Management and Health Policy
 Journal of Laboratory and Precision Medicine
 Journal of Medical Artificial Intelligence
 Journal of Public Health and Emergency
 Journal of Spine Surgery
 Journal of Thoracic Disease
 Journal of Visualized Surgery
 Journal of Xiangya Medicine
 Laparoscopic Surgery
 Longhua Chinese Medicine
 Mediastinum
 Mesentery and Peritoneum
 mHealth
 Microphysiological Systems
 Non-coding RNA Investigation
 Pediatric Medicine
 Pharmacogenomics Research and Personalized Medicine
 Precision Cancer Medicine
 Quantitative Imaging in Medicine and Surgery
 Shanghai Chest
 Stem Cell Investigation
 Therapeutic Radiology and Oncology
 Translational Andrology and Urology
 Translational Breast Cancer Research
 Translational Cancer Research
 Translational Gastroenterology and Hepatology
 Translational Lung Cancer Research
 Translational Pediatrics
 Video-Assisted Thoracic Surgery
 临床与病理杂志
 眼科学报

References

External links

Publishing companies established in 2009
Open access publishers